Gastric nerve may refer to:

Celiac ganglia, large nerve ganglia that innervate most of the digestive tract
Vagus nerve, the tenth cranial nerve